Alexander Burnett (also known as Alex Burnett) is a London-based singer, songwriter and music producer known for collaborations with major artists including DJ Snake, Hayden James, Thelma Plum, Flight Facilities, Elderbrook,Alison Wonderland, Mansionair, Japanese Wallpaper, Hudson Taylor, and for fronting the band Sparkadia and being part of the London collective KOMMUNION.

In 2011, he was labelled "what might be Australia's best rising songwriter" by the Sydney Morning Herald.

Sparkadia
Attracted by guitar music and indie pop, Burnett formed his first band, The Spark, in 2004 with drummer David Hall. After touring Australia for a year in 2006 the group signed to Ark Recordings in the UK and Ivy League records in Australia, and changed their name to Sparkadia.

Their debut album Postcards was recorded and produced by Ben Hillier (Blur, Depeche Mode) at Miloco Studios in London in 2007 and released in 2008. Nominated for Album of the Year in that year's J Awards, it achieved Gold sales in Australia. The hit single "Jealousy" hit #79 in Triple J's Hottest 100 for 2008. Sparkadia went on to tour internationally, playing at many of the European summer festivals including Glastonbury and T in the Park and opening for acts including Vampire Weekend, Death Cab for Cutie, Tegan and Sara, and Jimmy Eat World. After an Australian tour in 2009 playing Big Day Out, several of Alexander's Sparkadia bandmates went on to other projects.

Alexander spent time in Berlin, Stockholm, New York City, and Los Angeles, before moving to London in 2010. There he made the second Sparkadia album, The Great Impression, as a solo project, playing all the instruments, with Mark "Tieks" Tieku (Florence and the Machine) co-producing. Inspirations for the record ranged from Berlin-era David Bowie to Roy Orbison to Javanese Gamelan. The album debuted at #8 on the ARIA charts and placed in the top 50 for the following year, also achieving Gold sales, with three singles placing in the Hottest 100. The single "China" was a finalist in the 2011 Vanda and Young Songwriting Competition. His tour dates in 2011 with the new members of Sparkadia included Splendour in the Grass, which also featured Coldplay and Kanye West.

Collaborations
In 2011, Burnett co-wrote "2 Hearts" on Digitalism's 2011 album I Love You, Dude. The same year, Burnett co-wrote and produced the lead single "Act Yr Age" for Bluejuice's album Company. The following year, he worked again with Bluejuice on their single "S.O.S." and co-wrote Hudson Taylor's breakthrough single "Battles".

In 2014, he co-wrote and produced George Maple's breakthrough hit "Talk Talk". This was reworked by DJ Snake and released in 2016 as "Talk", which hit #13 on Billboard's hot dance/electronic chart in the US.  He also co-wrote Bluejuice's final single, "I'll Go Crazy" and was a writer on Bliss n Eso's gold single "Act Your Age", which won APRA's 2014 Urban Work of the Year award.

In 2015, he co-wrote Hayden James's "Something About You", which hit No. 44 on the Triple J Hottest 100, 2015. He also wrote three tracks for Alison Wonderland as well as singles by Flight Facilities and Motez. In November of that year he was among the speakers at the Electronic Music Conference, along with Flume and Porter Robinson. In 2016 he wrote with Japanese Wallpaper on 'Cocoon', Hayden James' 'Just a Lover', The Kaiser Chiefs' return single 'Hole in My Soul', and other songs with Joy, Paces, and Nicole Millar. 2017 saw collaborations with Rationale, Grades, Tieks with Chaka Khan, LDRU, BETSY, and Dan Sultan on his album Killer.

At the start of 2018 he co-wrote and produced "Clumsy Love" from Gamilaraay singer-songwriter Thelma Plum's first release since 2014 The same year, his co-write with Dan Sultan, 'Hold It Together', received an APRA Song of the Year nomination. He accumulated further writing and producing credits in 2018, with Elderbrook, Jack River, Mansionair, Graace, Japanese Wallpaper, Yates, and Muto.

April 2021 saw 'Better in Blak' written by Alex and Thelma Plum win the highly coveted 'Vanda and Young' Global songwriting competition. Another collaboration, 'Homecoming Queen' placed third.

Discography (as producer and songwriter)

Triple J Hottest 100 Appearances

Antony & Cleopatra
Full article & discography at Antony & Cleopatra.

2014: Formation

Producer and collaborator Mark-Anthony Tieku (AKA "Tieks") introduced Burnett and Anita Blay (AKA CocknBullKid) during a pop songwriting session in 2014.

Burnett and Blay subsequently formed a deep house duo called Antony & Cleopatra. They soon featured on three singles in 2014: Lancelot's "Givin' It Up", Beni's "Protect", and Sammy Bananas' "Money Time".

Alexander has said that being brought on to write for Digitalism around 2011 was part of his motivation both as a songwriter and as an artist to transition away from Sparkadia and towards electronic music, also citing "falling a bit out of love with the guitar".

Releases 
Their debut single as lead artists, "Sirens", was released in 2015 and was followed with multiple singles and collaborations from 2015–2019.

November 23, 2018, saw the release of Antony & Cleopatra's 6-song debut EP, Hurt Like Hell, to strong reviews:

 ""Hurt Than Hell" packs a punch with its twisting synth stabs and looping vocals, while songs like "Hard Feelings" pulse with a thick house bounce and 8-bit twists which together, straddle on that fine line between both forward-thinking and nostalgic - something that is super, super hard to pull off, but something that Antony & Cleopatra do so with ease." — Pile Rats
 "Hurt Like Hell is like escaping into a dark basement club with pumping beats echoing off the red-lit walls for twenty minutes. Antony & Cleopatra create danceable tunes with new twists and turns making their electronic project standout, and unlike other artists this Duo does not get lost in wide seas and endless possibilities of electronically produced music. Recognising that it is not about who can layer the most beats, they pick the most interesting tunes out of the broad spectrum and arrange them carefully to an intelligent EP, and a ready-made playlist for any good party." 4/5 stars — The AU Review
 "The “Hurt Like Hell” EP is a strong offering from the London duo, keeping the tradition of UK house music alive while adding a fresh modern take on production." — The Kollection
 "From its warped melodies, rubber mallet beats, and swirling, psychedelic, electronic notes, 'Hurt Like Hell' is instantly recognisable as an addictive hit."— Air It

Live 
The duo's first Australian tour was part of the 2017 Alison Wonderland's 'Scarehouse Project' alongside other acts such as Lunice, Lido, ASAP Ferg and Saatchi.

The next year they went on to play Australia's largest winter music festival Splendour In The Grass in July 2018.

Additional work 
The duo have also provided vocals on:

Awards and nominations

APRA Awards
The APRA Awards are presented annually from 1982 by the Australasian Performing Right Association (APRA), "honouring composers and songwriters". They commenced in 1982.

! 
|-
| 2012 
| "Act Your Age" – Bliss n Eso featuring Bluejuice (Alexander Burnett, Jeremy Craib, James Cibej, Jacob Stone, Stavros Yiannoukas, James Hauptmann)
| Song of the Year
| 
| 
|-
| 2014 
| "Act Your Age" – Bliss n Eso featuring Bluejuice
| Urban Work of the Year
| 
| 
|-

References

External links
 Official Alexander Burnett website
 Alexander Burnett instagram
 Official Sparkadia website
 Official Antony & Cleopatra website

Living people
Australian pop singers
Australian expatriates in England
Year of birth missing (living people)